Champagne Chanoine Frères is a Champagne producer based in the Reims region of Champagne. The house, founded in 1730, produces both vintage and non-vintage cuvee as well as an extra dry series of wines known as Tsarine and Tsarina.

See also
 List of Champagne houses

References

Champagne producers